Diastoporidae is a family of bryozoans belonging to the order Cyclostomatida.

Genera:
 Bidiastopora
 Clinopora Marsson, 1887 
 Discosparsa d'Orbigny, 1853 
 Fascipora d'Orbigny, 1853 
 Microecia

References

Bryozoan families